Fritillaria tortifolia is a flowering plant species in the lily family Liliaceae. It is found only in the northwestern part of Xinjiang Province, the extreme northwestern corner of China.

Fritillaria tortifolia produces bulbs up to 30 mm in diameter. The stem is up to 100 cm tall. The flowers are pendent, nodding, bell-shaped, whitish or very pale yellow with purple or brown markings.

formerly included
In 1989, Duan & Zheng  recognized several taxa at the varietal level, none of which is accepted in more recent sources. Some are now regarded as synonymous with Fritillaria tortifolia (see synonym list at right). Three others are now considered synonyms of Fritillaria verticillata:
Fritillaria tortifolia var. albiflora
Fritillaria tortifolia var. citrina
Fritillaria tortifolia var. parviflora

References

External links
Pacific Bulb Society, Asian Fritillaria Four photos of several species including Fritillaria tortifolia
The Fritillaria Group, The Alpine Garden Society, Fritillaria species T - Z photos of several species including Fritillaria tortifolia
Rudolfs Garden Images Fritillaria tortifolia color photo

tortifolia
Flora of Xinjiang
Plants described in 1987